Jovana Jovović (born 4 December 2001) is a Serbian handball player for Debreceni VSC and the Serbian national team.

She represented Serbia at the 2019 World Women's Handball Championship.

References

External links

Serbian female handball players
2001 births
Living people
People from Vrbas, Serbia
Expatriate handball players
Serbian expatriate sportspeople in Hungary
Competitors at the 2022 Mediterranean Games
Mediterranean Games bronze medalists for Serbia
Mediterranean Games medalists in handball